Poetica may refer to:

Books
Poetics (Aristotle)
Poetica, a work by Girolamo Muzio

Music
Poetica (iiO album)
Poetica (All Beauty Sleeps), a 2013 album by Sopor Æternus & the Ensemble of Shadows

Typeface
Poetica (typeface)